Kun-Liang Guan (born 1963), is a Chinese-born American biochemist. He won the MacArthur Award in 1998.

Career
In 1963, Guan was born in Tongxiang (Jiaxing, Zhejiang Province), China. In 1982, Guan graduated (B.S.) from the Department of Biology, Hangzhou University (previous and current Zhejiang University).  He did his postgraduate study at Purdue University (Ph.D. 1989; Advisor: Prof. Henry Weiner). In 1992, Guan joined the faculty in the University of Michigan (UM) Department of Biological Chemistry. From 1996 to 2000, he was an associate professor at UM. In 2000 Guan became a professor (Halvor Christensen Collegiate Professor in Life Sciences, 2003–2007) at UM.

In 1998, Kun-Liang Guan was rewarded a MacArthur Fellowship, with a grant of $230,000 over five years. Before this, he won the Schering-Plough Award, by the American Society for Biochemistry and Molecular Biology (ASBMB).

Guan currently is a professor of the Department of Pharmacology and the Moores Cancer Center at University of California, San Diego (UCSD). Guan's research focuses on cancer biology and the intracellular signal transduction in cell growth regulation. Guan has made seminal contributions in the fields of protein tyrosine phosphatase, Mitogen-Activated Protein (MAP) kinase, and the mammalian Target of Rapamycin (mTOR) pathways. Guan and his team have published numerous influential papers in, many publications, such as Cell, Nature and Science.

Research in Guan's laboratory focuses on intracellular signal transduction in cell growth regulation and cancer biology.

Tuberous sclerosis complex (TSC) is an autosomal dominant disorder characterized by the development of benign tumors in a wide range of tissues. Mutations in either the TSC1 or TSC2 tumor suppressor gene are responsible for TSC disease. TSC1 and TSC2 proteins form a physical and functional complex.

Recent studies from Guan's laboratory demonstrate that TSC1/TSC2 functions to inhibit the mammalian target of rapamycin (mTOR), which is a central cell growth controller conserved from yeast to human. mTOR integrates a wide range of signals, including growth factors, nutrients, and stress conditions, to regulate cell growth and cell size.

Two distinct TOR complexes, TORC1 and TORC2, have been identified. These two TOR complexes phosphorylate different substrates and have distinct physiological functions. For example, TORC1 phosphorylates the ribosomal S6 kinase (S6K), thereby regulating translation and cell growth.

In contrast, TORC2 phosphorylates and activates AKT, a key kinase involved in cell growth and apoptosis. Guan and his team are interested in how mTOR is regulated by upstream signals, such nutrients and cellular energy levels. In addition, they are studying the mechanism of mTOR activation by the phosphatidyl inositol 3-kinase (PI3K).

The second project in his laboratory is studying the novel Hippo tumor suppressor pathway. Recent genetic studies in Drosophila have shown that the Hippo signaling pathway plays a key role in restricting organ size by controlling both cell proliferation and apoptosis. Components of the Hippo pathway are highly conserved in mammalian cells. Acting down stream of the Hippo pathway is the YAP oncogene, which encodes a transcription co-activator.

Their recent studies have shown that regulation of YAP by the Hippo pathway plays a critical role in cell contact inhibition. Furthermore, YAP is elevated in many human cancers. The main focus of this project is to elucidate the physiological regulation of the Hippo pathway and to understand how dysregulation of the pathway contributes to tumorigenesis.

References

External links
 Biochemist Kun-Liang Guan named a MacArthur Fellow
 Kun-Liang Guan's homepage at UM
 

1963 births
Living people
American biochemists
Chinese emigrants to the United States
Educators from Jiaxing
Hangzhou University alumni
MacArthur Fellows
Purdue University alumni
Zhejiang University alumni
University of Michigan faculty
Scientists from Jiaxing